Pakistan Railway Hospitals is a chain of government hospital located throughout country and is under the administration of Pakistan Railways.

History
The hospitals were constructed during the British Raj.

In January 2019, a nursery ward was inaugurated at the Railway Hospital Multan. Since 2020, the hospitals in Lahore, Karachi, Multan are operated by the Islamic International Medical College Trust (IIMCT) under the public-private partnership for thirty years.

Hospitals
 Railway Hospital Multan, It has a capacity of 500 beds but only 84 beds are operational.
 Railway Hospital Lahore
 Railway Hospital Peshawar
 Railway Hospital Karachi
 Railway Hospital Sukkur
 Railway Hospital Quetta

References

Hospital networks in Pakistan
Railway hospitals
Pakistan Railways